Bridge  Division, Suffolk is an electoral division of Suffolk which returns one county councillor to Suffolk County Council. It is located in the South West Area of Ipswich and consists of all of Bridge Ward and part of Alexandra Ward of Ipswich Borough Council.

References

Electoral Divisions of Suffolk